Siam Park is a water park in Costa Adeje, a coastal suburb in Tenerife, Canary Islands. Siam Park features a Siamese (Thai) theme. The park was opened by the Princess of Thailand Maha Chakri Sirindhorn. The principal owners are Wolfgang Kiessling and his son Christoph. A second park is planned for the neighbouring island of Gran Canaria.

History
Siam Park's construction started in 2004 and cost 52 million euros (US$58.7 million). Originally stated to open in May 2007, it has endured construction problems, however the park finally opened to the public on September 17, 2008.  The park's plans also originally included a roller coaster, but the park has opted to focus on developing the first phase of the park in order to open the park as soon as possible.

Siam Park includes Thai theming on all of its rides, park buildings, and restaurants. The park's 25 buildings are the largest collection of Thai-themed buildings outside Thailand. The park's designer, Christoph Kiessling, received permission from the Thai royal family to use the park's name and theme; but, to respect the family's wishes, he did not copy royal palaces, temples, or statues of Buddha in the park.

Rides

Vulcano: a four-person ProSlide BehemothBowl 60 slide with a laser show inside of a large bowl like structure.
The Dragon: a ProSlide Tornado 60 with a -wide funnel and a large dragon model overlooking the drop.  
Wave Palace: a wave pool manufactured by Murphys Waves Ltd in Scotland with an artificial white sand beach. The park's surfing school will give surfing lessons at the Wave Palace.
Naga Racer: a six-lane ProSlide ProRacer mat racing slide.
The Giant: twin ProSlide CannonBowl 40s, one moving clockwise and one moving counterclockwise depending on whether you are a double or single rider.
Tower of Power: a vertical, transparent ProSlide Freefall which sends riders through an area with sharks, stingrays and fish. 
The river gives riders an option at the end to divert into a lift which leads to a slide, which leads to the riders viewing some sharks.
Jungle Snakes: four twisting ProSlide PipeLine slides which follow the park's terrain. They are Cobra, Boa, Viper and Python. Two are standard PipeLine slides, and two are Turbo PipeLines, based on their speeds.
Lost City: a children's play structure with 120 games.
Mekong Rapids: a ProSlide Mammoth 4 person family raft ride river rapids ride.
Singha: a 2015 ProSlide hybrid of a RocketBlast and FlyingSaucer 45 which sends riders upwards and through multiple Flying Saucer features. It reaches speeds of 18 m/s. This was made in conjunction with the Thai beer brand Singha which features its logo around the ride.
Patong Rapids: this family raft ride opened in 2018 and it's situated next to Mekong Rapids. It is a world's first version of a ProSlide Mammoth going into a double FlyingSaucer 45 feature.
Coco Beach Wave Pool: Completed in November 2018 the newly installed unique shallow water wave pool by Murphys Waves Ltd has been specially designed for children and younger family members.

Technical information
The park is built on a hill, which permits the slides to follow the park's terrain similar to terrain roller coasters.  Hence, they lack the prominent support structure present in most water slides.
Kiessling calls Siam Park the "first air conditioned outdoor aquatic park in the world".

To conserve the island's water, Siam Park has a desalination plant on site, which desalinates  of sea water per day.  After the water is used in the rides, the park recycles the water by using it to water the park's plants. In addition, Siam Park has the first natural gas plant in the Canary Islands.

Records

 2015 Travellers' Choice Winner Tripadvisor: World's best waterpark.
2017 Travellers' Choice Winner Tripadvisor: World's best waterpark.

References

External links

Tourist attractions in Tenerife
Water parks in Spain
Buildings and structures in Tenerife
Companies of the Canary Islands